John Aloysius Belton (1903–1968) was an Irish diplomat.

Details 
From 1926 to 1934 he practised laws on the Midland Circuit
In 1934 he joined the diplomatic service of Ireland and became the first secretary to the Irish Embassy in Paris.
From 1941 to 1946 he was a legation councilor to the Legation of the Republic of Ireland in London.
In 1946 he was Chargé d'affaires in Stockholm.
From 1946 to 1949 he was Envoy Extraordinary and Minister Plenipotentiary in Madrid.
From June 1951 to March 1955 he was Ambassador in Bonn.
From 1964 to 1967 he was Ambassador in Ottawa.

References

1903 births
1968 deaths
Ambassadors of Ireland to Sweden
Ambassadors of Ireland to Spain
Ambassadors of Ireland to Germany
Ambassadors of Ireland to Canada